Events in the year 2007 in Monaco.

Incumbents 
 Monarch: Albert II
 State Minister: Jean-Paul Proust

Events 

 August – The Sovereign Prince was a guest of Russian President Vladimir Putin at a czarist residence outside of St. Petersburg. Putin thanked the Prince, who is on the International Olympic Committee, for his support in the selection of Sochi for the 2014 Winter Olympics. The Prince also took part in a four-day, 100-km dogsled expedition to the North Pole from a Russian base.

Deaths

See also 

 2007 in Europe
 City states

References 

 
Years of the 21st century in Monaco
2000s in Monaco
Monaco
Monaco